The Briegleb BG-6 was a 1930s single-seat glider designed by William G. Briegleb to be both factory and homebuilt.

Development
The BG-6 is a high-wing single-seat glider with a steel-tube-and-fabric fuselage, wooden wings with fabric covering and a metal-and-fabric tail. The type certificate was approved on 14 September 1940.

Nine gliders were built by Briegleb's company, the Sailplane Corporation of America, and 67 kits were sold to homebuilders. Three factory-built gliders were impressed into service with the United States Army Air Forces in 1942.

Variants
BG-6
Company designation for both factory and homebuilt aircraft.
XTG-9
United States Army Air Corps designation for three factory built BG-6s which were impressed as training gliders in 1942.

Aircraft on Display
National Soaring Museum - In Storage

Operators

United States Army Air Corps

Specifications (BG-6)

See also
Briegleb El Mirage Airfield

References

Notes

Bibliography

Sailplane Directory

1930s United States sailplanes
Glider aircraft
BG-6
Homebuilt aircraft
Aircraft first flown in 1939